Book of the Wicked, Chapter One is a mixtape by DJ Clay. Released in 2010, it is the first installment of a series of mixtapes which contain brand new and remixed songs from artists from the Psychopathic Records and Hatchet House roster. The second chapter was released on December 7, 2010.

Background
On February 19, 2008, DJ Clay released Let 'Em Bleed: The Mixxtape, Vol. 1, the first installment of a series of mixtapes which contain brand new and remixed songs from artists from the Psychopathic Records and Hatchet House roster. Clay continued the series through 2009. That June, Mike E. Clark began his own series of mixtapes with Psychopathic Murder Mix Volume 1. On March 23, 2010, all four Let 'Em Bleed mixtapes were released in the Let 'Em Bleed: The Mixxtapes Boxset. In the May 7 edition of the Hatchet Herald, it was announced that DJ Clay would be releasing a new series of mixtapes called Book of the Wicked.

Production
The original version of the song "Fuck the World" (remix) is by Insane Clown Posse, from their album The Amazing Jeckel Brothers. The song "I Live My Life on Stage" features the beat from Boondox's song "Untold/Unwritten," from his album Krimson Creek.

Track listing

Personnel

Musicians
Mike E. Clark - producer
Leah Compagnoni - skit vocals
Eric Davie - producer
Greg Dery - skit vocals
DJ Clay - producer, vocals
Mike Fortunate - skit vocals
Robby Grahm - skit vocals
Dub Musik - producer
Willie E. - additional guitar
Violent J - vocals
Axe Murder Boys - vocals
Blaze - vocals
Anybody Killa - vocals
Twiztid - vocals
Boondox - vocals
Shaggy 2 Dope - vocals

Chart positions

References

2010 mixtape albums
Hatchet House compilation albums